Polyipnus oluolus is a species of ray-finned fish in the genus Polyipnus. It is found in the Marshall Islands.

References

Sternoptychidae
Endemic fauna of the Marshall Islands
Fish described in 1971